The King's Artillery Regiment was an artillery regiment of the Royal Danish Army.

History
The Kongens Artilleriregiment was formed on 1 August 1982 by merging Kronens Artilleriregiment from Sjælsmark barracks and Sjællandske Artilleriregiment from Holbæk barracks. On 1 November 2005 Kongens Artilleriregiment was merged with Dronningens Artilleriregiment to create the new artillery regiment, Danske Artilleriregiment. The regiment was located on Sjælsmark barracks.

Units
 
  1st Armoured Artillery Battalion (1982-2004) part of 1st Zealand Brigade
  2nd Artillery Battalion (1982-2004) part of ELK/Corps Artillery
  4th Light Artillery Battalion (1982-1996) part of 4th Zealand Battle Group,(from 1990)1st Zealand Battle Group
  5th Armoured Artillery Battalion (1982-2004) part of 2nd Zealand Brigade (from 1994 part of Danish International Brigade)
  13th Anti Air Artillery Battalion (1982-2000) part of LANDZEALAND/Corps Artillery
  14th Light Artillery Battalion (1982-1985) part of LANDZEALAND/Corps Artillery
  16th Light Artillery Battalion (1982-1990) part of 1st Zealand Battle Group. Transferred to North Jutland Artillery Regiment 
  17th Heavy Artillery Battery (1985-1996) - 17th MLRS Battery (1997-2004) part of LANDZEALAND/Corps Artillery
  21st Light Artillery Battalion (1982-2000) part of 3rd Zealand Battle Group
  22nd Light Artillery Battalion (1982-2000) part of 2nd Zealand Battle Group 
  32nd Heavy Artillery Battalion (1982-1985) - 32nd Artillery Battalion (1986-2000) part of LANDZEALAND/Corps Artillery, (2000-2004) part of HOK 
  Staff and Target Acquisition Battery/LANDZEALAND (1982-2004) part of LANDZEALAND/Corps Artillery

Military units and formations established in 1982
Artillery regiments of Denmark
1982 establishments in Denmark